"Snow Drop" is the fourteenth single by L'Arc-en-Ciel, released on October 7, 1998 it debuted at number 1 on the Oricon chart. The single was re-released on August 30, 2006. The song was used as the theme song to the TV drama Hashire Kōmuin!.

Cover versions
The American R&B group Boyz II Men recorded an English language cover of the song for L'Arc-en-Ciel's 2012 tribute album.

Track listing

References

1998 singles
L'Arc-en-Ciel songs
Oricon Weekly number-one singles
Songs written by Hyde (musician)
Songs written by Tetsuya (musician)
Japanese television drama theme songs
Songs about nuclear war and weapons
1998 songs
Ki/oon Music singles